Kelly Starrett (born 1973) is a Doctor of Physical Therapy, author, speaker and CrossFit trainer. His 2013 fitness book, Becoming a Supple Leopard, was featured on The New York Times bestselling sports books list. He is a co-founder, with his wife Juliet Starrett, of the fitness website The Ready State, formerly MobilityWOD. He has been described as a "celebrity" and "founding father" of CrossFit, as well as ranking on Greatist's 2017 list of the 100 most influential people in health and fitness.

Early life
Kelly Starrett grew up in Garmisch, Germany, where he enjoyed Alpine ski racing and kayaking. He was raised by a single mother, an American-born professor, and did not have contact with his father. When he was in high school, he and his mother moved to the United States. He attended the University of Colorado.

Athletic and fitness career
Before discovering CrossFit, Starrett paddled for the US canoeing and kayaking teams.  As a paddler, he won two national championships and competed in two world championships before receiving a repetitive strain injury.  In 2004, he and his wife Juliet began CrossFit training, eventually opening one of the first CrossFit gyms, San Francisco CrossFit in 2005. 

Starrett received a Doctor of Physical Therapy from Samuel Merritt University in 2007.  In 2009, the Starretts started their fitness website MobilityWOD, which has been praised as a top fitness blog by Outside Magazine and other outlets.

Since 2013, Starrett's fitness career has focused primarily on publishing and continued CrossFit and mobility training.  He was featured by 60 Minutes Sports in 2014 for his work on posture and mobility, and has worked with his wife on a children's fitness nonprofit in 2015.

Writing
Starrett is the author of three books on fitness and mobility.  Before writing full-length books, Starrett contributed articles to the Crossfit Journal, focusing on the basics of posture and gait.  He has continued in this vein with his first book, The Supple Leopard (2013), which highlights basic mechanics and range of motion.  Becoming a Supple Leopard was generally well received, making the New York Times bestselling sports books list, though it did receive criticism for being "a trial and error method rather than a system of standard operating procedures to diagnose and fix movement."

Following the success of Becoming a Supple Leopard, Starrett released Ready to Run with coauthor T.J. Murphy in 2014.  Ready to Run examines shoe choice and foot health as well as exercises to improve running biomechanics and mobility.  Erin Bresini, writing for Outside Magazine described the book as offering relief from running injuries. In his review for Breaking Muscle, Doug Dupont found the book "simple and accurate," but noted that the book "might not meet expectations" since it does not contain actual training plans.

Starrett's 2016 book Deskbound was coauthored with his wife Juliet Starrett and Glen Cardoza. Deskbound describes the physiological and epidemiological effects of a sedentary lifestyle.  The book was precipitated by the launch of the Starretts' nonprofit, StandUpKids, which raises money to purchase standing desks for children in schools.

Starrett has a chapter giving advice in Tim Ferriss' book Tools of Titans.

Personal life
He and his wife Juliet Starrett have two daughters.

References

1973 births
Living people
CrossFit coaches
American physiotherapists
Samuel Merritt University alumni
University of Colorado alumni
People from Garmisch-Partenkirchen